Glenn Springs Historic District is a national historic district located at Glenn Springs, Spartanburg County, South Carolina. It encompasses 18 contributing buildings and 3 contributing sites in the historic health resort of Glenn Springs. The community developed as a resort around the mineral springs between about 1840 and 1940. The district includes several residences, two boarding houses, Cates House Ruins, Calvary Protestant Episcopal Church, Presbyterian Church, Cates Store, Glenn Springs Post Office, a pavilion, a cemetery, and the site of the Glenn Springs Hotel.  It includes notable buildings in the Greek Revival, Gothic Revival, Queen Anne, and Bungalow styles.

It was listed on the National Register of Historic Places in 1982.

References

Historic districts on the National Register of Historic Places in South Carolina
Greek Revival architecture in South Carolina
Gothic Revival architecture in South Carolina
Queen Anne architecture in South Carolina
Buildings and structures in Spartanburg County, South Carolina
National Register of Historic Places in Spartanburg County, South Carolina